In 1246, Güyük Khan sent a letter to Pope Innocent IV, demanding his submission. The letter was in Persian and Middle Turkic, which was used for the preamble.

The preamble reads as follows:

The letter was a response to a 1245 letter, Cum non solum, from the pope to the Mongols.

Güyük, who had little understanding of faraway Europe or the pope's significance in it, demanded the pope's submission and a visit from the rulers of the West to pay homage to Mongol power:

Bibliography
 Rachewiltz, I, Papal Envoys to the Great Khans, Stanford University Press, 1971.

References

1246 works
Mongol Empire
Letters (message)
Holy See–Mongolia relations
Persian literature
Turkic languages